Audrey Hollander (born 1979) is an American pornographic film actress and director.

Career
Active in the pornography industry since 2003,
Hollander has starred in more than 200 films.
She co-directed the film Otto & Audrey Destroy The World (2005) with her husband Otto Bauer, and won the AVN Award for Female Performer of the Year in 2006.

Personal life
Hollander was married to pornographic film actor Otto Bauer for over ten years. They divorced prior to 2015.
A pornographic scene between Hollander and Bauer figured in a 2007 obscenity trial against distributors Five Star Video and JM Productions.

Awards
2005 AVN Award for Best All-Girl Sex Scene (Video) – The Violation of Audrey Hollander (with Gia Paloma, Ashley Blue, Tyla Wynn, Brodi & Kelly Kline)
2005 XRCO Award for Best Girl/Girl – The Violation of Audrey Hollander
2006 Venus Paris Fair / EuroEline Awards : Best International Actress
2006 AVN Award for Female Performer of the Year
2006 AVN Award for Best Group Sex Scene (Video) – Squealer (with Smokie Flame, Jassie, Kimberly Kane, Otto Bauer, Scott Lyons, Kris Slater & Scott Nails)
2006 AVN Award for Best Anal Sex Scene (Film) – Sentenced (with Otto Bauer)
2008 AVN Award for Most Outrageous Sex Scene – Ass Blasting Felching Anal Whores (with Cindy Crawford & Rick Masters)

References

Further reading

External links

 
 
 
 

1979 births
American pornographic film actresses
Living people
AVN Award winners
21st-century American women
American pornographic film directors
Women pornographic film directors